Laxmaiah Manchikanti (born 10 July 1947) is an Indian American physician and anesthesiologist specializing in interventional pain management, professor, philanthropist, and author. He is the founder of the American Society of Interventional Pain Physicians (ASIPP), the Society of Interventional Pain Management Surgery Centers (SIPMS), the Pain Physician,  and the Pain Medicine Case Reports medical journals. He has been credited with advancing the evolution and development of interventional pain management as a specialty. Interventional pain management was recognized as a specialty in 2002 by the Centers for Medicare and Medicaid Services. In March, 2005 interventional pain management was provided with mandatory representation on the Medicare Carrier Advisory Committee. Manchikanti has served as clinical professor of Anesthesiology and Perioperative Medicine at the University of Louisville School of Medicine since 2012 and professor of Anesthesiology-Research at the Louisiana State University School of Medicine, LSU Health Sciences Center, New Orleans since 2017, and previously at Shreveport, LA. He has served as chairman of the board and chief executive officer of ASIPP since 1998. He has been Medical Director of the Pain Management Centers of Paducah, Kentucky and Marion, Illinois and the Ambulatory Surgery Center in Paducah, Kentucky since 1992. He co-founded a multistate national company, Pain Management Centers of America (PMCOA), in 2019 with Mahendra Sanapati, MD.

Personal background 
Laxmaiah Manchikanti was born on 10 July 1947, in Bodangparthy, Princely state of Hyderabad of British India (Now Telangana, India). He is the son of Manchikanti Yadagiri and Manchikanti Laxmamma. He is the oldest child of the family, with three brothers and four sisters. After early education in Bodangparthy, Pullemla, and Munugode of Nalgonda District, Manchikanti graduated from higher secondary school in Hyderabad in Telangana. On 4 June 1975, he married Chandrakala, the daughter of Pampati Pedda Hanumanthu and Manikyamma. They have three children; Anupama M. Gomez, Sunil Manchikanti, and Kavita Manchikanti, MD.

Education and certification 
He attended medical school at Gandhi Medical College, Osmania University, graduating in 1972. He obtained his medical degree in 1973, following a one-year flexible internship. He completed his senior internship in internal medicine at Gandhi Hospital in Secunderabad from 1973-1974. In 1974, he began a two-year residency in anesthesiology at Osmania University, after which he received Diplomate Certification in Anesthesiology.

After his arrival in the United States, Manchikanti completed a one-year residency in anesthesiology with the Youngstown Hospital Association, affiliated with the Northeast Ohio Medical University, formerly known as the Northeastern Ohio Universities Colleges of Medicine. This was followed by a one-year residency in anesthesiology with the Allegheny General Hospital in Pittsburgh, Pennsylvania. In 1980, he completed a fellowship in anesthesiology and critical care medicine at the University of Pittsburgh School of Medicine.

In 1980, he earned Diplomate Certification from the American Board of Anesthesiology. He also holds subspecialty certifications from the World Institute of Pain (Fellow of Interventional Pain Practice, 2002); American Board of Interventional Pain Physicians (Diplomate, 2006-recertified in 2015); and the American Board of Anesthesiology (Subspecialty Certification in Pain Medicine, 1993—recertified in 2003 and 2011).

Academic career 
In 1980, Manchikanti joined an anesthesiology practice at Lourdes Hospital in Paducah, Kentucky. In 1988, he began devoting his practice to interventional pain management and established the Pain Management Center of Paducah, Kentucky followed in 1996 by the Pain Management Center of Marion, Illinois. Since 1998, with the formation of ASIPP, and subsequently SIPMS, he has been instrumental in developing evidence-based interventional pain management techniques and advocating for accountable care.

Professional affiliations 
Manchikanti is the Chairman of the Board and Chief Executive Officer of the American Society of Interventional Pain Physicians, as well as the Society of Interventional Pain Management Surgery Centers. He is also a member of the Kentucky Carrier Advisory Committee and the Kentucky All Schedule Prescription Electronic Reporting Task Force, also known as KASPER. He has also led the effort to establish the National All Schedules Prescription Electronic Reporting (NASPER) Act, which is designed to help with the prescription drug abuse problem by having a central reporting system for doctors and pharmacists to keep track of these prescriptions. In 2005, NASPER was enacted into law, with all US states creating their own prescription drug monitoring programs. ASIPP is honoring Dr. Manchikanti by dedication of Manchikanti Distinguished Lecture at all annual meetings.

Board memberships 
 Celerian Group Company Carrier Advisory Committee
 House of Delegates of the American Medical Association
 American Society of Interventional Pain Physicians – Chairman of the Board and Chief Executive Officer (since 2004)
 Licensure Board of the Kentucky Board of Medical Licensure (2002–2007)
 Medicare Coverage Advisory Committee (2005–2007)
 Murray State University Board of Regents (2007–2010)

Philanthropy 
In 1999, Manchikanti established the MGM Trust, which provides educational scholarships in the US and India. The first school that was built under the MGM Trust was the Manchikanti Gopamma Memorial Zilla parishad Primary and High School, located in Bodangparthy. The Manchikanti Yadagiry Junior College was established in 2008, serving secondary school students. By the conclusion of the 2016 academic year, the student body of both schools had increased to approximately 1,400, with 70 teachers and 20 non-teaching staff. These activities are now provided by the Lions Club of Hyderabad-Bodangiparthy - Chandrakala & Laxmaiah Manchikanti Foundation.

Manchikanti has sponsored the Gandhi Medical College Alumni Education Center, located in Hyderabad, Telangana, India. In his honor, the auditorium was named the Manchikanti Laxmaiah Auditorium. Additional philanthropic support by the Manchikanti Trust includes establishing a Sri Venkateswara temple in Bodangparthy.

In his honor, the McCracken County High School in Kentucky named the school's library "The Manchikanti Library".

In his honor, the Murray State University Paducah Regional Campus in Kentucky named a classroom and laboratory the "Dr. Laxmaiah Manchikanti Classroom and Laboratory."

Published works 
He has written and edited twelve books including the most recent, Essentials of Interventional Techniques in Managing Chronic Pain, published 4 Jan 2018. He has also written over 500 articles listed in the index medicus (PubMed) of the United States National Library of Medicine. In addition to articles based on his randomized trials and clinical research of interventional pain management techniques, he has provided analysis of public health policy. Additional topics he has written on include medical coding, compliance, practice management, and the deleterious effects of prescription opioids with their overuse, misuse, abuse, and diversion.; </ref>

References

External links 
 
 http://www.painphysicianjournal.com

Indian anesthesiologists
Living people
1947 births
Medical doctors from Hyderabad, India
20th-century Indian medical doctors